Tony Clarke (April 13, 1940 – August 28, 1971) was an American soul singer and songwriter.

Early life and career
Clarke, thought to have been born Ralph Thomas Williams in New York City, was raised in Detroit.  He performed as a singer and made his first recordings for the small Stepp label in the late 1950s.
He wrote the songs "Pushover" and "Two Sides to Every Story", hits for Etta James, with Billy Davis.

Clarke had his first chart entry in 1964 with "(The Story of) Woman, Love and a Man", which reached No. 88 on the R&B chart.  He had more success with his own song, "The Entertainer", which hit No. 10 R&B and No. 31 Pop in the U.S. in 1965.  In 1966, he moved from Detroit to Hollywood, and secured a small part in the film They Call Me Mister Tibbs!.

He was fatally shot by his estranged wife when he broke into her house in Detroit. After his death, his popularity  saw a resurgence in the 1970s on the United Kingdom's Northern soul scene particularly with his recordings of “The Entertainer” and "Landslide".

References

External links

1940 births
1971 deaths
20th-century African-American male singers
American soul singers
Chess Records artists
Deaths by firearm in Michigan
Mariticides
Murdered African-American people
American murder victims
Northern soul musicians
Singers from New York (state)
Singers from Michigan
Songwriters from New York (state)
Songwriters from Michigan
1971 murders in the United States